Connecticut's 89th House of Representatives district elects one member of the Connecticut House of Representatives. It consists of the towns of Bethany, Prospect, and parts of Cheshire. Ithas been represented by Republican Lezlye Zupkus since 2013.

Recent elections

2020

2018

2016

2014

2012

References

89